Sydney Blythe was an English cinematographer.

Selected filmography

 The Faithful Heart (1922)
 Married Love (1923)
 The Knockout (1923)
 She (1925)
 If Youth But Knew (1926)
 Q Ships (1928)
 The Infamous Lady (1928)
 At the Villa Rose (1930)
 Lord Richard in the Pantry (1930)
 Alibi (1931)
 Black Coffee (1931)
 A Night in Montmartre (1931)
 The Lyons Mail (1931)
 Splinters in the Navy (1931)
 A Tight Corner (1932)
 The Face at the Window (1932)
 Once Bitten (1932)
 I Lived with You (1933)
 Excess Baggage (1933)
 This Week of Grace (1933)
 The Wandering Jew (1933)
 Say It with Flowers (1934)
 Bella Donna (1934)
 Blind Justice (1934)
 Kentucky Minstrels (1934)
 Lily of Killarney (1934)
 Lord Edgware Dies (1934)
 The Man Who Changed His Name (1934)
 The Broken Melody (1934)
 She Shall Have Music (1935)
 The Rocks of Valpre (1935)
 Vintage Wine (1935)
 D'Ye Ken John Peel? (1935)
 The Lad (1935)
 A Fire Has Been Arranged (1935)
 Squibs (1935)
 Scrooge (1935)
 Eliza Comes to Stay (1936)
 In the Soup (1936)
 The Angelus (1937)
 Death Croons the Blues (1937)
 A Romance in Flanders (1937)
 Beauty and the Barge (1937)
 Underneath the Arches (1937)
 A People Eternal (1939)

References

External links
 

1887 births
Date of death unknown
English cinematographers
Film people from London